San Lorenzo is a census-designated place in Grant County, New Mexico, United States. Its population was 97 as of the 2010 census. A post office operated from 1886 to 1963.

References

Census-designated places in Grant County, New Mexico
Census-designated places in New Mexico